This article lists the squads for the 2023 Turkish Women's Cup, the 6th edition of the Turkish Women's Cup. The cup consists of a series of friendly games, and is held in Turkey from 13 to 22 February 2023. The six national teams involved in the tournament registered a squad of 23 players.

The age listed for each player is on 13 February 2023, the first day of the tournament. The numbers of caps and goals listed for each player do not include any matches played after the start of tournament. The club listed is the club for which the player last played a competitive match prior to the tournament. The nationality for each club reflects the national association (not the league) to which the club is affiliated. A flag is included for coaches that are of a different nationality than their own national team.

Group A

Slovenia
Coach: Borut Jarc

The squad was announced on 1 February 2023. Before the start of the tournament Lara Klopčič was replaced by Adrijana Mori.

South Africa
Coach: Desiree Ellis

The squad was announced on 6 February 2023.

Turkey
Coach: Necla Güngör

Turkey withdrew before the beginning of the tournament due to the situation caused by the 2023 Turkey–Syria earthquake.

Uzbekistan
Coach:  Midori Honda

The squad was announced on 10 February 2023.

Venezuela
Coach:  Pamela Conti

On 10 February 2023, it was announced that the team withdrew from the tournament, in solidarity with Turkey and Syria due to the unfortunate situation of earthquakes.

Zambia
Coach: Bruce Mwape

A preliminary squad was announced on 1 February 2023. The final squad was announced on 10 February 2023.

Group B

Bulgaria
Coach: Silvia Radoyska

The squad was announced on 6 February 2023.

Estonia
Coaches: Anastassia Morkovkina & Sirje Roops

The final squad was announced on 13 February 2023.

Hong Kong
Coach:  José Ricardo Rambo

Jordan
Coach:  David Nascimento

A preliminary squad was announced on 4 February 2023. The following week, the team announced their withdrawal, due to the earthquakes in the area.

Kosovo
Coach:  Karin Anneli Andersen

The final squad was announced on 13 February 2023.

North Macedonia
Coach: Kiril Izov

The squad was announced on 15 February 2023.

Player representation

By club
Clubs with 3 or more players represented are listed.

By club nationality

By club federation

By representatives of domestic league

References

2023